South Otterington is a village and civil parish in the Hambleton district of North Yorkshire, England.

History

Otterinctune in the Allerton hundred is mentioned in the Domesday Book. The manor was split between Egelfride and Haldor at the time of the Norman invasion and subsequently passed to the Crown.

Part of the manor was granted to Robert Brus, whose family held it until 1242 when it was granted to Byland Abbey who held it until the dissolution. Another part of the manor was granted to the Fossard family who held it until 1279 when it was passed to Richard Malbiche. At some point in the early 17th century, most of the lands of the manor were in the possession of the Talbot family of Thornton-le-Moor. The name is probably from Old English relating to a person named Otter and the suffix tun meaning settlement.

The village had a station on the North Eastern Railway.  station was opened on 31 March 1841 and closed to passengers 15 September 1958 before final closure on 10 August 1964. The station was next to the road bridge over the lines.

Governance

The village is in the Thirsk and Malton UK Parliament constituency. It is in the Thorntons ward of Hambleton District Council and Sowerby electoral division of North Yorkshire County Council.

Geography

The nearest settlements are Newby Wiske  to the west and Thornton-le-Moor  to the east. The village is located to the east of the River Wiske on the A167 road. Howe Beck flows through the north end of the village to join the River Wiske.

Demography
The 1881 UK Census recorded the population as 349. The 2001 UK Census recorded the population as 344, of which 269 were over the age of sixteen years and of those, 181 were in employment. There were 141 dwellings of which 85 were detached. The split of male to females was 47.4% and 52.6% respectively. The mean age of the population was 37.98 years old.

Transport
The East Coast Main Line passes to the east of the village.  The former Otterington railway station, on Station Road, closed in 1958. 

The North Yorkshire County Council bus service 153 runs 3 times daily from Northallerton to Thirsk via Thornton-le-Moor, South Otterington, Sandhutton and Carlton Miniott.

Education

There was a school built in the village in 1856. A new building, South Otterington CE Primary School, was built in 1993 to accommodate an expansion in pupil numbers following the closure of the schools in nearby Newby Wiske and Thornton-le-Moor. It incorporates pre-school facilities.

Religion

The village church is dedicated to St Andrew. It is a Grade II Listed building that was rebuilt in 1846 on the site of an earlier Norman church.

Notable inhabitants
Andy Preston, the Mayor of Middlesbrough and a former hedge fund manager, has lived at Otterington Hall since at least 2007.

References

External links

Villages in North Yorkshire
Civil parishes in North Yorkshire